Kim Min-hee or Yeomhong (born Kim Yoon-kyung, August 28, 1972) is a South Korean trot singer and actress.

Awards and nominations

References

1972 births
Living people
South Korean television actresses
South Korean film actresses
South Korean stage actresses
South Korean musical theatre actresses
South Korean child actresses
South Korean radio presenters
Actresses from Seoul
Dongguk University alumni
20th-century South Korean actresses
21st-century South Korean actresses
South Korean women radio presenters